Andokavan is a village in the Kajaran Municipality of the Syunik Province in Armenia. The 4th-century Baghaberd fortress is located close to Andokavan.

Demographics 
Andokavan was not listed in the 2011 Armenian census. However, following the 2017 reforms, Andokavan appeared in the records with a total population of 118.

Municipal administration 
The village was a part of the community of Lernadzor until the June 2017 administrative and territorial reforms, when the village became a part of the Kajaran Municipality.

References 

Populated places in Syunik Province